Knoutsodonta sparsa is a species of sea slug, a dorid nudibranch, a shell-less marine gastropod mollusc in the family Onchidorididae.

Distribution
This species was described from Cullercoats, North Tyneside, England. It is currently known from the European coasts of the North Atlantic Ocean from Norway, Orkney and Sweden south to the northern coast of Spain.

Diet
Knoutsodonta sparsa feeds on the bryozoan Cellepora pumicosa. It has also been reported to eat Porella concinna.

References

Onchidorididae
Gastropods described in 1846